Marco Pedotti (born 20 April 1977) is an Italian former professional footballer who played as a centre-back.

Club career 
On 22 July 2006, Pedotti moved to Serie C2 side Benevento, before joining Ternana in the Serie C1 on 25 July 2007. He joined Crotone on 3 February 2009, then Lecco in February 2010, mid-2009–10 season. Following a season at Insubria, Pedotti joined Caratese on 14 January 2011.

References

External links 
 
 
 Marco Pedotti at Carriere Calciatori.it

1977 births
Living people
People from Cuggiono
Footballers from Lombardy
Italian footballers
Association football central defenders
Como 1907 players
A.C. Legnano players
S.S. Verbania Calcio players
Lucchese 1905 players
A.S. Sambenedettese players
A.C. Reggiana 1919 players
A.S.D. Martina Calcio 1947 players
Benevento Calcio players
Ternana Calcio players
F.C. Crotone players
Calcio Lecco 1912 players
S.C. Caronnese S.S.D. players
U.S. Folgore Caratese A.S.D. players
Serie D players
Serie C players
Serie B players
Sportspeople from the Metropolitan City of Milan